Carol Claire Aguilar Banawa-Crisostomo (born March 4, 1981), better known in the Philippines as Carol Banawa, is a US-based Filipina singer, actress, and nurse. She is a Star Magic Batch 4 alumna.

Early life and career
Raised in Batangas, she has two siblings, Alexander and Cherry. Banawa started singing when she was a little girl while her family lived in Saudi Arabia. Her family then moved back to the Philippines. There, she was invited to join the new roster of ABS-CBN stars through the children-oriented show Ang TV.

She has performed at the Madison Square Garden in New York City at the 2003 New York Music Festival.

In 2010, she made her comeback in the music industry, and starred in the hit Philippine TV series, Mara Clara, where she sang the opening song of the said TV series. She also covered Till My Heartaches End, the theme song of the 2010 film of the same name.

In 2016, her song "Bakit 'Di Totohanin" was featured in one of the scenes of the U.S. drama series The Vampire Diaries.

Discography

Studio albums

Other appearances

Compilation appearances

Filmography

Television

Film

Theater

Awards and nominations

2011
 Nominated in 3rd Star Awards For Music for "Female Pop Artist Of The Year"
 Winner in ASAP Pop Viewers Choice 2011 for "Pop Movie Themesong"

2004
 Follow Your Heart album received platinum record award
 Awit Awards Nomination for "Awit sa Ina ng Santo Rosaryo"

2003
 "Special Award" New York Music Festival
 Follow Your Heart album received gold record certification after three weeks from its release date
 Transition album garnered platinum record award
 Awit Awards 2003 – nominated Best Pop Female Vocal Performance for "Stay"
 MTV Pilipinas Awards 2003 – nominated for Favorite Female Artist

2002
 Transition album garnered gold record award
 Repackaged self-titled album, Carol garnered multi-platinum status

2001
 Awit Awards' record of the year – "Iingatan Ka" from the Tanging Yaman – Inspirational Album
 Self-titled album, Carol garnered platinum award
 Special citation for her participation in the 1999 Asian Songfest in which she represented the Philippines
 People's Choice Awards 2001 – Most Promising Host Entertainer Awardee

1999
 Silver winner for Asia New Singer Competition at the Shanghai Song Festival
 Gold record for self-titled album, Carol
 Best Pop Female Vocal Performance in the 5th Katha Music Awards

1998
 3rd prize winner in the Metropop Song Festival
 Finalist for Munting Mutya

Hiatus
Banawa took a break from the Philippine music scene in August 2003 to attend to the treatment of her father who was exposed to lethal levels of carbon monoxide. She is married to Ryan Crisostomo and has three children together. She obtained an associate degree in nursing and graduated summa cum laude from the Northern Virginia Community College, Washington, D.C. in 2018. She later obtained a bachelor's degree in nursing from Grand Canyon University in 2020. Presently, she is an OR registered nurse based in the United States.

In 2004, Pinoyvision Records released her Platinum Hits Collection album, a compilation of her songs. The album also comes with a VCD of Banawa's hit music videos such as "Stay", "Ocean Deep" and "Noon at Ngayon".

References

External links
 Carol Banawa (Artist Info)
 Carol Banawa Biography
 Carol Banawa Biography (page 2)
 The Carol Banawa Story (Entertainment Feature)
 Star Records Music Publishing
 Platinum Hits Collection Info
 Tanging Yaman Movie Review

1981 births
20th-century Filipino actresses
20th-century Filipino women singers
21st-century Filipino actresses
21st-century Filipino women singers
American Idol participants
Expatriate actresses in the United States
Filipino child actresses
Filipino child singers
Filipino expatriates in the United States
Filipino film actresses
Filipino television personalities
Filipino women comedians
Living people
People from Pasay
Singers from Metro Manila
Star Magic
Star Music artists